The Instituto de Historia de Cuba in Havana, Cuba, is a research institute, archive, and library of late 19th and 20th century Cuban history. It was established in 1987 under the Central Committee of the Communist Party of Cuba. It is located in the Palacio de Aldama near the Parque de la Fraternidad in Havana. Among its collections are records related to Sergio Carbó y Morera and Ramón Grau. Staff of the institute have included , among others. According to its website, research focuses on topics such as Cuban economics, politics, society, regional history, and international relations.

See also
 Bay of Pigs: 40 Years After (conference), co-sponsored by the institute in 2001

References

This article incorporates information from the Spanish Wikipedia.

Bibliography

External links
 Official site

Research institutes established in 1987
Historical research institutes
1987 establishments in Cuba
Organizations based in Havana
Archives in Cuba
Research institutes in Cuba